Lime Grove may refer to:
Lime Grove, Nebraska, a community in the United States
Lime Grove Studios, a film production studio